John Swinton may refer to:

Sir John Swinton, 14th of that Ilk, Scottish soldier and mercenary leader
Sir John Swinton, 15th of that Ilk
John Swinton (died 1679), Scottish figure  of the Wars of the Three Kingdoms and Interregnum
Sir John Swinton (died 1723), his son, Scottish politician
John Swinton (1703–1777), British writer, academic, clergyman and orientalist
John Swinton, Lord Swinton (1723–1799), Scottish lawyer, judge and writer
John Swinton (journalist) (1829–1901), American editorial writer and labor newspaper publisher
John Swinton of Kimmerghame (1925–2018), British general
John Swinton (theologian), Scottish academic and clergyman

See also
Swinton (surname)